Arslano-Amekachevo (Arıślan-Ämäkäs) is a rural locality (a village) in Krivle-Ilyushkinsky Selsoviet, Kuyurgazinsky District, Bashkortostan, Russia. The population was 159 as of 2010. There are 5 streets.

Geography 
Arslano-Amekachevo is located 27 km southeast of Yermolayevo (the district's administrative centre) by road. Pavlovka is the nearest rural locality.

References 

Rural localities in Kuyurgazinsky District